Pre-cancer of the breast is a precancerous condition of the breast.  It may eventually develop into breast cancer.  There are two types:

 Ductal carcinoma in situ, the most common type of breast pre-cancer
 Lobular carcinoma in situ, pre-cancer of the breast that is outside the milk ducts

Breast cancer
Breast